The 2016–17 Rice Owls men's basketball team represented Rice University during the 2016–17 NCAA Division I men's basketball season. The Owls, led by third-year head coach Mike Rhoades, played their home games at Tudor Fieldhouse in Houston, Texas as members of Conference USA. They finished the season 23–12, 11–7 in C-USA play to finish in fifth place. They defeated Southern Miss in the first round of the C-USA tournament before losing in the quarterfinals to UTEP. They received an invitation to the College Basketball Invitational where they defeated San Francisco in the first round before losing in the quarterfinals to Utah Valley.

On March 21, 2017, head coach Mike Rhoades resigned to become the head coach at VCU. He finished at Rice with a three-year record of 47–52. On March 23, the school promoted assistant coach Scott Pera to head coach.

Previous season
The Owls finished the 2015–16 season 12–20, 7–11 in C-USA play to finish in a three-way tie for ninth place. They lost in the second round of the C-USA tournament to Charlotte.

Preseason 
The Owls were picked to finish in ninth place in the preseason Conference USA poll. Marcus Evans was selected to the preseason All-Conference USA team.

Departures

Recruiting class of 2016

Roster

Schedule and results

|-
!colspan=9 style=| Exhibition

|-
!colspan=9 style=| Non-conference regular season

|-
!colspan=12 style=| Conference USA regular season

|-
!colspan=9 style=| Conference USA tournament

|-
!colspan=9 style=| CBI

See also
2016–17 Rice Owls women's basketball team

References

Rice Owls men's basketball seasons
Rice
Rice